The Nunnery is an estate outside of Douglas on the Isle of Man, named after a religious foundation on the site, at .

The Nunnery is located on Old Castletown Road, Braddan. In 1999, the estate was acquired for the Isle of Man International Business School, now part of the University College Isle of Man.

History

Monastic era

The Priory of Douglas was a monastery of nuns, possibly dating to the reign of Rǫgnvaldr Guðrøðarson, King of the Isles (1187-1226). King Robert Bruce spent the night at the nunnery on Sunday, May 22, 1313 prior to beginning his siege of Rushen Castle the next day. He took the castle three weeks later. The nunnery was suppressed by King Henry VIII in 1540. Nothing remains of the monastery. In 1610, the Nunnery was granted to the Earl of Derby by King James.

Post Dissolution
The buildings were acquired by Richard Calcot, Comptroller of the Isle of Man, who is said to have married the last Prioress, Margaret Goodman. The family occupied a house on the site until their descendants, the Heywoods, sold it to the Taubmans in 1776.  A new mansion was built for John Taubman in 1823. It was designed by both John Pinch the elder and his son, John Pinch the younger, of Bath, built in the "Strawberry Hill" Gothic Revival style. The only surviving monastic building, St. Bridget's Chapel, served as a coach house for centuries, but it was restored to its original use as a place of worship in the 1880s. The building was used in this manner until 1998, when new owners evicted the congregation, and it was deconsecrated as a chapel.

The mansion remained in the possession of the Taubman family: George Taubman Goldie was born here in 1846. This remained the case until the estate was acquired by the Isle of Man International Business School in 1999 to serve as their site of operations, following which the Isle of Man University Centre was established there in 2008. The Nunnery also served as the home of Culture Vannin until its relocation to St. John's in 2016.

References

Sources
 David E. Easson, Medieval Religious Houses (Scotland), with an Appendix on the Houses in the Isle of Man (1957).
 Ian B. Cowan, David E. Easson, Medieval Religious Houses (Scotland), 2nd ed. (1976). .

External links
 Isle of Man Business School
 Manx notebook on The Nunnery, Douglas

Buildings and structures in the Isle of Man
History of the Isle of Man